Supply chain diversification is manufacturing business terminology, used to describe the act of increasing choices, when to order what supplies from whom, to bring products to the market. It describes the abundance and flexibility of the suppliers for a certain product. As in any business decision, there are advantages and disadvantages to having more or less diversification in the supply chain.

Supply chain diversification is not a simple method of making suppliers compete with each other for the best price. It is more about preparing the supply chain to be flexible in response to pressures in the marketplace.

Simply having an abundance of suppliers, does not mean that a business has a diversified supply chain: each supplier must provide similar and/or equal products and be distinguishably competitive in such a way that each supplier is mutually exclusive under certain conditions. For example, supplier Alpha and supplier Beta both sell identical sprockets. Alpha sells each sprocket for $1.00 a piece and can fulfill the order in 24 hours. Beta sells each sprocket for $0.25 but they will take two weeks to fulfill. The trade-offs between time and cost is the decision one must make.

In diversifying the supply chain for a product, it is also necessary to assist and educate the suppliers on what one expects from the suppliers and what one intends to do with the supplies. It becomes important to maintain an open line of communication with all the suppliers, and this in turn will increase the overhead necessary to maintain the managers/reps for each supplier. To minimize the overhead involved, method of developing a relationship with their suppliers such as RFPs and taking bids on jobs can be utilized.

When doing business with multiple companies, such is the case here, it may become necessary to standardize paperwork – such as RFQs, and purchase orders. As price fixing is illegal in countries such as the United States, traceable paper trail management becomes a legal obligation for companies seeking supply chain diversification.

In the International market, import and export regulations may become a hurdle for finding the right suppliers to diversify ones supply chain. This is especially true for US businesses after 9/11. The US customs department has enacted new regulations such as C-TPAT to encourage trade. The extra time and money spent on certifying a supplier for regulations like C-TPAT is another trade-off that management must consider when diversifying their supply chain.

Legacy suppliers
When diversifying your supply chain, the question arises, "What do we do with our old suppliers?"

Because supply chain diversification cannot occur overnight, the legacy supplier must be involved throughout the transition phase. In most cases, the legacy supplier will remain as the primary supplier even after diversification, as there is usually good reason that they became the original supplier.

The most common cases of the original suppliers being phased out after diversification is when supplies were being provided in-house or the material provided by that supplier has become obsolete. This is usually not the case with third-party suppliers, as the market drives them to stay competitive.

As with any new supplier, communicating with the legacy suppliers of the new direction of one's company is important for a smooth transition. At first, legacy suppliers may be apprehensive about the diversification, as it brings competition to an otherwise dominated market. That is why it is important that each supplier is distinguished from one another and they are not in direct competition with each other. Otherwise, diversification may cause duplicated efforts, extra costs, and non-cooperation that the price savings may not be able to justify.

References

Supply chain management